Queen Elizabeth (ship) may refer to any one of many ships:

 , either of two ships of that name, or one planned ship that was cancelled
 
 Queen Elizabeth 2
 
   was launched at Pownall Bay, Prince Edward Island. She sailed to England, transferred her registry to England, and was last listed in 1831.

See also
 Queen Elizabeth class (disambiguation)

Ship names